The Sentinel-class cruisers were a pair of scout cruisers built for the Royal Navy in the first decade of the 20th century. The sister ships spent about half of the first decade of their careers in reserve and were based in home waters when on active duty. When the First World War began in August 1914 they were given coastal defence missions on the north eastern coast of Britain. The ships were transferred to the Mediterranean in 1915 and then to the Aegean in mid-1916 where they remained until the end of the war in late 1918.  was paid off in 1919 and was scrapped the following year, but  supported the British attempt to intervene in the Russian Civil War for a few months after the end of the war. She also returned home in 1919, but served as a training ship for a few years before she was broken up in 1923.

Background and description
In 1901–1902, the Admiralty developed scout cruisers to work with destroyer flotillas, leading their torpedo attacks and backing them up when attacked by other destroyers. It accepted four of the submissions and ordered one ship from each builder in the 1902–1903 Naval Programme and a repeat in the following year's programme.

The two ships from Vickers became the Sentinel class. Four more 12-pounders were added to the specification in August. Their crew consisted of 289 officers and ratings.

The Sentinel-class ships were powered by a pair of four-cylinder triple-expansion steam engines, each driving one shaft, using steam provided by a dozen Vickers Express water-tube boilers that exhausted into three funnels. The Sentinels barely exceeded their design speed when they ran their sea trials in 1905. The scout cruisers soon proved too slow for this role as newer destroyers outpaced them.

The main armament of the Sentinel class consisted of ten QF 12-pounder 18-cwt guns. Three guns were mounted abreast on the forecastle and the quarterdeck, with the remaining four guns positioned port and starboard amidships. They also carried eight QF 3-pounder Hotchkiss guns and two single mounts for 18-inch torpedo tubes, one on each broadside.

Ships

Service history
The sisters were on and off active service in British waters for most of the first decade of their existence. After the beginning of the First World War, they were assigned to coastal defence duties, Sentinel on the Scottish coast and Skirmisher at the Humber estuary. The ships were sent to the Mediterranean in 1915 and were then assigned to the Aegean Sea two years later and remained there until the end of the war. After returning home in 1919, Skirmisher was paid off and was sold for scrap in early 1920. Sentinel was sent to the Black Sea for a few months after the end of the war as the British attempted to intervene in the Russian Civil War. She too returned home in 1919, but served as a training ship in 1920–1922 before being broken up in 1923.

Notes

Footnotes

Bibliography

External links

Sentinel class in World War I
History of the Sentinel class

 
Cruiser classes
Ship classes of the Royal Navy
World War I cruisers of the United Kingdom